Mashaba  may refer to:
Mashava (formerly known as Mashaba), mining village in Masvingo Province, Zimbabwe
Ephraim Mashaba (born 1950), South African football coach
Herman Mashaba (born 1959), a Mayor of Johannesburg.
Thomas Mashaba, South African is a featherweight professional boxer
Kobamelo Mashaba,(Born 1985) Lecturer at University of Botswana, Studied and worked at Australia from (2013 to 2019)
Godfrey Mashava, (Born 1982) All time consultant, pilot, engineer and from royal family, the King (2019)

Philani Mashaba, (Born 1998)
All time self-taught Graphic designer and Entrepreneurship, the founder of Mckarma Studios(2020)